The Ópera de Arame, in Portuguese, or the Wire Opera, in English, is a theatre house located in the city of Curitiba, the capital of the state of Paraná, in southern Brazil. It is one of the major tourist attractions of the city. The opera house has a capacity of 2,400 spectators.

Situated in the middle of an urban green park, Parque das Pedreiras, which can be translated as "Rocky Mountains Park", the Wire Opera House theatre is built out of steel tubes. It is built on the site of a former rock quarry close to "Pedreira de Paulo Leminski." The structure was built in the center of an artificial lake and is accessed by a walkway. Designed by Domingos Bongestabs, the metallic structure weighs a total of 360 tons of steel. The structure was built in 75 days and opened on March 18, 1992. It underwent many changes until 2006. The idea in 1992 was to offer to the public an outdoor space, with a new and innovative perspective, where artists could present their music.
The place was built almost "engraved" in the middle of a natural structure of rocky mountains. Some of the side "walls" of the rocks are used to place information the tourist can access while visiting, to know more about the Wire Opera. Currently, there are many plates with dates of landmarks and names of important people who were there.
On one wall, a plate reads: "On 22 December 1992, Tom Jobim,  glory of the Brazilian music, presented himself in this Wire Opera".

See also
List of concert halls
List of opera houses

References

Theatres in Curitiba